The Toronto streetcar system is a network of nine streetcar routes in Toronto, Ontario, Canada, operated by the Toronto Transit Commission (TTC). It is the busiest light-rail system in North America. The network is concentrated primarily in Downtown Toronto and in proximity to the city's waterfront. Much of the streetcar route network dates from the 19th century. Most of Toronto's streetcar routes operate on street trackage shared with vehicular traffic, and streetcars stop on demand at frequent stops like buses.

Toronto's streetcars provide most of the downtown core's surface transit service. Four of the TTC's five most heavily used surface routes are streetcar routes.

History

Pre-TTC history (1861–1921) 

The main predecessors of the TTC were:
 Toronto Street Railway (1861–1891)
 Toronto Railway Company (1891–1921)
 Toronto Civic Railways (1911–1921)

In 1861, the City of Toronto issued a thirty-year transit franchise (Resolution 14, By-law 353) for a horse-drawn street railway, after the Williams Omnibus Bus Line had become heavily loaded. Alexander Easton's Toronto Street Railway (TSR) opened the first street railway line in Canada on September 11, 1861, operating from Yorkville Town Hall to the St. Lawrence Market. At the end of the TSR franchise, the City government ran the railway for eight months but ended up granting a new thirty-year franchise to the Toronto Railway Company (TRC) in 1891. The TRC was the first operator of horseless streetcars in Toronto. The first electric car ran on August 15, 1892, and the last horse car ran on August 31, 1894, to meet franchise requirements.

There came to be problems with interpretation of the franchise terms for the City. By 1912, the city limits had extended significantly, with the annexation of communities to the north (1912: North Toronto) and the east (1908: Town of East Toronto) and the west (1909: the City of West Toronto—The Junction). After many attempts to force the TRC to serve these areas, the City created its own street railway operation, the Toronto Civic Railways (TCR) to do so, and built several routes. Repeated court battles forced the TRC to build new cars, but they were of old design. When the TRC franchise ended in 1921, the Toronto Transportation Commission was created, combining the city-operated Toronto Civic Railways lines into its new network.

Early TTC history (1921–1945) 
The TTC began in 1921 as solely a streetcar operation, with the bulk of the routes acquired from the private TRC and merged with the publicly operated Toronto Civic Railways. In 1923, the TTC took over the Lambton, Davenport and Weston routes of the Toronto Suburban Railway (TSR) and integrated them into the streetcar system.

In 1925, routes were operated on behalf of the Township of York (as Township of York Railway), but the TTC was contracted to operate them. One of these routes was the former TSR Weston route and the others were the TTC Oakwood and Rogers Road streetcar routes. The Weston streetcar route was replaced by electric trolley buses in 1965, while Rogers Road route was replaced by the 63 Ossington trolley bus route; ultimately diesel bus routes replaced the trolley buses in 1992.

In 1927, the TTC became the operator of three radial lines of the former Toronto and York Radial Railway. The TTC connected these lines to the streetcar system in order to share equipment and facilities, such as carhouses, but the radials had their own separate management within the TTC's Radial Department. The last TTC-operated radial (North Yonge Railways) closed in 1948.

Plans for abandonment (1945–1989) 
After the Second World War, many cities across North America and Europe began to eliminate their streetcar systems in favour of buses. During the 1950s, the TTC continued to invest in streetcars and the TTC took advantage of other cities' streetcar removals by purchasing extra PCC cars from Cleveland, Birmingham, Kansas City, and Cincinnati.

In 1966, the TTC announced plans to eliminate all streetcar routes by 1980. Streetcars were considered out of date, and their elimination in almost all other cities made it hard to buy new vehicles and maintain the existing ones. Metro Toronto chair William Allen claimed in 1966 that "streetcars are as obsolete as the horse and buggy". Many streetcars were removed from service when Line 2 Bloor–Danforth opened in February 1966.

The plan to abolish the streetcar system was strongly opposed by many people in the city, and a group named "Streetcars for Toronto" was formed to work against the plan. The group was led by Professor Andrew Biemiller and transit advocate Steve Munro. It had the support of city councillors William Kilbourn and Paul Pickett, and urban advocate Jane Jacobs. Streetcars for Toronto presented the TTC board with a report that found retaining the streetcar fleet would, in the long run, be cheaper than converting to buses. This combined with a strong public preference for streetcars over buses changed the decision of the TTC board.

The busiest north–south and east–west routes were replaced respectively by the Yonge–University and the Bloor–Danforth subway lines, and the northernmost streetcar lines, including the North Yonge and Oakwood routes, were replaced by trolley buses (and later by diesel buses). Two lines that operated north of St. Clair Avenue were abandoned for other reasons. The Rogers Road route was abandoned to free up streetcars for expanded service on other routes. The Mount Pleasant route was removed because of complaints that streetcars slowed automobile traffic. Earlier, the TTC had contemplated abandonment because replacement by trolleybuses was cheaper than replacing the aging tracks.

However, the TTC maintained most of its existing network, purchasing new custom-designed Canadian Light Rail Vehicles (CLRV) and Articulated Light Rail Vehicles (ALRV), with the first CLRV entering service in 1979. It also continued to rebuild and maintain the existing fleet of PCC (Presidents' Conference Committee) streetcars until they were no longer roadworthy.

When Kipling station opened in 1980 as the new western terminus of Line 2 Bloor–Danforth, it had provision for a future streetcar or LRT platform opposite the bus platforms. However, there was no further development for a surface rail connection there.

In the early 1980s, a streetcar line was planned to connect Kennedy station to Scarborough Town Centre. However, as that line was being built, the Province of Ontario persuaded the TTC to switch to using a new technology called the Intermediate Capacity Transit System (now Bombardier Innovia Metro) by promising to pay for any cost overruns (which eventually amounted to over $100million). Thus, the Scarborough RT (now Line 3 Scarborough) was born, and streetcar service did not return to Scarborough, instead stopping at the boundary.

Late 20th-century expansion (1989–2000) 

The TTC returned to building new streetcar routes in 1989. The first new line was route 604 Harbourfront, starting from Union station, travelling underneath Bay Street and rising to a dedicated centre median on Queen's Quay (along the edge of Lake Ontario) to the foot of Spadina Avenue. This route was lengthened northward along Spadina Avenue in 1997, continuing to travel in a dedicated right-of-way in the centre of the street, and ending in an underground terminal at Spadina station. At this time, the route was renamed 510 Spadina to fit with the numbering scheme of the other streetcar routes. This new streetcar service replaced the former route 77 Spadina bus and, since 1997, has provided the main north–south transit service through Toronto's Chinatown and the western boundary of University of Toronto's main campus. The tracks along Queen's Quay were extended to Bathurst Street in 2000 to connect to the existing Bathurst route, providing for a new 509 Harbourfront route from Union station to the refurbished Exhibition Loop at the Exhibition grounds, where the annual Canadian National Exhibition is held.

21st century (2001–present) 
By 2003, two-thirds of the city's streetcar tracks were in poor condition as the older track was poorly built using unwelded rail attached to untreated wooden ties lying on loose gravel. The result was street trackage falling apart quickly requiring digging up everything after 10 to 15 years. Thus, the TTC started to rebuild tracks using a different technique. With the new technique, concrete is poured over compacted gravel, and the ties are placed in another bed of concrete, which is topped by more concrete to embed rail clips and rubber-encased rails. The resulting rail is more stable and quieter with less vibration. The new tracks are expected to last 25 years after which only the top concrete layer needs to be removed in order to replace worn rails.

Route 512 St. Clair was rebuilt to restore a separated right-of-way similar to that of the 510 on Spadina Avenue, to increase service reliability and was completed on June 30, 2010.

On December 19, 2010, 504 King streetcar service returned to Roncesvalles Avenue after the street was rebuilt to a new design, which provided a widened sidewalk "bumpout" at each stop to allow riders to board a streetcar directly from the curb. When no streetcar is present, cyclists may ride over the bumpout as it doubles as part of a bike lane.

On October 12, 2014, streetcar service resumed on 509 Harbourfront route after the street was rebuilt to a new design that replaced the eastbound auto lanes with parkland from Spadina Avenue to York Street. Thus, streetcars since then run on a roadside right-of-way immediately adjacent to a park on its southern edge.

The Toronto Transit Commission eliminated all Sunday-only stops on June 7, 2015, as these stops slowed down streetcars making it more difficult to meet scheduled stops. Sunday stops, which served Christian churches, were deemed unfair to non-Christian places of worship, which never had the equivalent of a Sunday stop. Toronto originally created Sunday stops in the 1920s along its streetcar routes to help worshippers get to church on Sunday for religious services.

The first two Flexity Outlook streetcars entered service on route 510 Spadina, on August 31, 2014; at the same time, all-door boarding and proof-of-payment (POP) was introduced on all 510 Spadina streetcars. Fare payments by Presto on the Flexity cars was introduced on November 30, 2014. On November 22, 2015, the TTC started to operate its new fleet of Flexity Outlook streetcars from its new Leslie Barns maintenance and storage facility.

On December 14, 2015, the TTC expanded Presto, POP and all-door loading to include all streetcars on all routes. All streetcar passengers are required to carry proof that they have paid their fares such as a validated TTC senior, youth or student ticket; an adult single-ride ticket; a paper transfer; or a Presto card or ticket while riding. At the same time, the TTC also activated the option for customers to purchase single-ride tickets using debit or credit cards on the fare vending machines on Flexity Outlook streetcars.

With the January 3, 2016, service changes, 510 Spadina became the first wheelchair-accessible streetcar route using mainly Flexity streetcars. However, CLRV and ALRV streetcars were used in some cases as a backup plan in the event there were not enough Flexity streetcars.

On June 19, 2016, the TTC launched the 514 Cherry streetcar route to supplement 504 King service along King Street between Dufferin and Sumach streets. The new route operated every 15 minutes or better and initially used some and later only the Commission's new accessible Flexity streetcars. The eastern end of the 514 route ran on a newly constructed branch, originally named the Cherry Street streetcar line, which is located in a reserved side-of-street right-of-way.

On September 12, 2017, 509 Harbourfront became the first streetcar route in Toronto to operate Flexity streetcars with electrical pickup by pantograph instead of trolley pole. That November, the King Street Transit Priority Corridor, a transit mall, was established along King Street between Bathurst and Jarvis streets.

On October 7, 2018, the 514 Cherry route was permanently cancelled. The service it provided was replaced by the 504 King, which was divided into two overlapping branches, each to one of the termini (Dufferin Gate Loop and Distillery Loop) of the former 514 route. That December, the TTC eliminated the option for passengers to purchase single-ride tickets by credit and debit cards on the Flexity streetcars due to reliability issues with the fare vending machines.

On September 2, 2019, the TTC retired the last of its ALRV streetcars. The next day, due to the construction work at the Queen, Kingston Road, Eastern Avenue intersection, the TTC eliminated the 502 Downtowner service indefinitely. Concordantly, the 503 Kingston Rd service, which used to operate during rush hours only, was upgraded to operate during all daytime hours Monday through Friday. This change also affected the 501 Queen service, with buses replacing streetcars east of Queen Street and Greenwood Avenue. The construction projects ended that November. While the 501 Queen resumed full streetcar service, the 502 remained eliminated and the consolidation of Kingston Road service into the 503 Kingston Rd route remained in effect.

On December 29, 2019, the TTC retired the last of its high-floor streetcars, the CLRVs. The final day for the CLRVs included a ceremonial farewell voyage along Queen Street, although the TTC plans to retain two CLRVs in Toronto for special events and charters. Since the retirement of the CLRVs, all TTC surface routes are served by accessible low-floor vehicles.

Incidents 

On December 16, 2010, the TTC suffered its worst accident since the Russell Hill subway crash in 1995. Up to 17 people were sent to hospital with serious but non-life-threatening injuries after a 505 Dundas streetcar heading eastbound collided with a Greyhound bus at Dundas and River Streets.

Routes 

Based on 2013 statistics, the TTC operated  of routes on  streetcar network (double or single track) throughout Toronto.  As of February 2022, there are nine regular streetcar routes on the TTC network.

Typically, all streetcar routes are serviced by low-floor and accessible Flexity Outlook vehicles. When replacement bus service is required (e.g., for track reconstruction, special events, emergencies, streetcar shortages), replacement buses bear the same route number and name as the corresponding streetcar route.

Route numbers 

Until 1980, streetcar routes had names but not numbers. When the CLRVs were introduced, the TTC assigned route numbers in the 500 series. CLRVs have a single front rollsign showing various combinations of route number and destination, while PCC streetcars showed a route identifier (route name until the 1980s and later route number) and destination on two separate front rollsigns. The digital destination signs on the Flexity Outlook streetcars show route number, route name and destination. Before 2018, streetcar-replacement bus services indicated route number and destination but not route name, like the CLRVs.

The four streetcar-operated Blue Night Network routes have been assigned 300-series route numbers. The other exception to the 500 series numbering was the Harbourfront LRT streetcar. When introduced in 1990, this route was numbered 604, which was intended to group it with the old (albeit unposted) numbering scheme for Toronto subway routes. In 1996, the TTC overhauled its rapid transit route numbers and stopped trying to market the Harbourfront route as "rapid transit". The number was changed to 510. The tracks were later extended in two directions to form the 510 Spadina and 509 Harbourfront routes.

Subway connections 

Union station serves as the hub for both the TTC and the GO Transit system.

Dedicated rights-of-way and transit malls 
The majority of streetcar routes in Toronto operate in mixed traffic, generally reflecting the original track configurations of the streetcar system, a system that dates back to the late 19th and early 20th centuries. However, newer trackage has largely been established within dedicated rights-of-way, in order to allow streetcars to operate with fewer disruptions due to delays caused by automobile traffic. Most of the system's dedicated rights-of-way operate within the median of existing streets, separated from general traffic by raised curbs and controlled by specialized traffic signals at intersections. Queen streetcars have operated on such a right-of-way along the Queensway between Humber and Sunnyside loops since 1957. Since the 1990s, dedicated rights-of-way have been opened downtown along Queens Quay, Spadina Avenue, St. Clair Avenue West, and Fleet Street.

Short sections of the track also operate in a tunnel (to connect with Spadina, Union, and St. Clair West subway stations).

During the late 2000s, the TTC reinstated a separated right-of-way, which had been removed between 1928 and 1935, on St. Clair Avenue for the entire 512 St. Clair route. A court decision obtained by local merchants in October 2005 had brought construction to a halt and put the project in doubt; the judicial panel then recused themselves, and the delay for a new decision adversely affected the construction schedule. A new judicial panel decided in February 2006 in favour of the city and construction resumed in mid-2006. One-third of the St. Clair right-of-way was completed by the end of 2006 and streetcars began using it on February 18, 2007. The portion finished was from St. Clair station (Yonge Street) to Vaughan Road. The second phase started construction in mid-2007 from Dufferin Street to Caledonia Road. Service resumed using the second and third phases on December 20, 2009, extending streetcar service from St. Clair to Earlscourt Loop located just south and west of Lansdowne Avenue. The fourth and final phase from Earlscourt Loop to Gunns Loop (just west of Keele Street) is completed and full streetcar service over the entire route was finally restored on June 30, 2010.

Between September 2007 and March 2008, the tracks on Fleet Street between Bathurst Street and the Exhibition Loop were converted to a dedicated right-of-way and opened for the 511 Bathurst and the 509 Harbourfront streetcars. Streetcar track and overhead power line were also installed at the Fleet loop, which is located at the Queen's Wharf Lighthouse.

The eastern portion of the 504A King route runs on a side-of-street right-of-way. It was constructed starting in 2012 to support redevelopment in the West Don Lands and the Distillery District, former industrial areas.

As part of the King Street Pilot Project, a temporary transit mall was set up along King Street for a one-year trial period starting in mid-November 2017. Although not a dedicated right-of-way, the transit mall achieves the goal of preventing road traffic from impeding streetcar service. Road traffic is discouraged from using the mall by being forced to leave the mall via a right turn at most signalized intersections. This project has since been extended and made permanent under the name King Street Transit Priority Corridor.

Planned expansion 
As of 2022, the City of Toronto and the TTC were planning the East Bayfront LRT to run along Queens Quay East from Union station to the Port Lands, to complement the 509 Harbourfront line.

In 2019, the TTC was considering changes to several streetcar routes. , these ideas had not been implemented. The changes considered were:
 Splitting 501 Queen into two overlapping branches: 501A from Neville Park Loop to Sunnyside Loop, and 501B from Long Branch Loop to a new Riverside Loop, to be constructed along Broadview Avenue just north of Queen Street East
 Extending 504B west to Humber Loop and later to a proposed Park Lawn Loop
 Extending 503 Kingston Road west to Dufferin Gate Loop

The City of Toronto proposed the Waterfront West LRT, a streetcar route that would run from Long Branch Loop along Lake Shore Boulevard and the Queensway to Colbourne Lodge Drive and then adjacent to the Lake Shore Boulevard via Dufferin Gate Loop to Exhibition Loop and into Union Station via Queens Quay. New track on a private right-of-way would be required between Colbourne Lodge Drive and Exhibition Loop.
In 2019, the City of Toronto approved new track linking Dufferin Gate and Exhibition Loops; however, no construction has started.

, two light-rail linesLine 5 Eglinton and Line 6 Finch Westare under construction. These two lines are not part of the Toronto streetcar system and use incompatible vehicles. (They use standard-gauge track rather than the streetcar system's broad gauge.) Both lines are considered part of the Toronto subway system.

Discontinued streetcar routes 
Between late 1921 and 1923, the TTC connected and merged many of the routes it inherited from the Toronto Railway Company and the Toronto Civic Railways. On July 1, 1923, the TTC did a major reorganization of routes whereby 9 new routes were created, 6 routes were discontinued, 13 were modified and 8 routes remained unmodified. The following list shows only those routes discontinued after this reorganization.

Rolling stock

Streetcars acquired by the TTC 

When the TTC was created in 1921, it acquired hundreds of cars from its two predecessor companies: the Toronto Railway Company and the Toronto Civic Railways. In 1927, the TTC acquired the radial cars of the former Toronto & York Radial Railway when it took over operation of that system from the Hydro-Electric Railways.

In the 1920s, the TTC purchased new Peter Witt streetcars, and they remained in use into the 1960s. In 1938, the TTC started to operate its first Presidents' Conference Cars (PCC), eventually operating more than any other city in North America. In 1979, the Canadian Light Rail Vehicles entered revenue service, followed by their longer, articulated variants, the ALRVs, in 1988. The last of the PCC vehicles were retired from full-time revenue service in 1995.

On August 31, 2014, the TTC started operating its first Bombardier Flexity Outlook vehicles. The last of the older CLRV and ALRV vehicles were retired from regular service in December 2019.

The following table summarizes streetcars purchased by the TTC since 1921. The main article has more details on rosters, including streetcars inherited from the Toronto Railway Company and the Toronto Civic Railways, which are not summarized here.

Streetcar shortage (2016–2020) 
From 2016 to 2020, the TTC faced a streetcar shortage because of:

 Delays in the delivery of the new Flexity streetcars
 The declining reliability and retirement of the aging CLRV/ALRV fleet
 A 20 percent increase in streetcar ridership since 2008
 Warranty repairs on 67 Flexity streetcars requiring the shipment of several streetcars at a time to a Bombardier plant

In January 2017, the TTC claimed that delays in delivery of the new Flexity Outlook streetcars had resulted in both streetcar and bus shortages. Because the CLRV/ALRV streetcars required extra maintenance, only 170 of the 200 CLRVs and ALRVs could be put into service. This shortage led to the replacement of streetcars by buses on some routes, which in turn led to a reduction of service on some bus routes.

To address the streetcar shortage, as well as construction projects, the TTC used bus substitution at various times on several streetcar routes. The first bus substitution due to the streetcar shortage occurred on the 502 Downtowner route on October 11, 2016.

Ridership on the 504 King increased by 25 percent after the implementation of the King Street Transit Priority Corridor through downtown King Street. Thus, in February 2018, the TTC replaced the CLRV streetcars on routes 505 Dundas and 506 Carlton with buses and reassigned those streetcars to other routes, such as 504 King and 511 Bathurst, to handle crowding from increased ridership.

The streetcar fleet capacity had not grown for almost three decades after the CLRVs and ALRVs were introduced. After delivery of the last of the initial 204 Flexity cars ordered, the TTC planned to purchase another 60 cars; however, the TTC estimated that would only satisfy demand until 2023 instead of 2027 as originally planned. Bombardier was the expected supplier for additional streetcars because, if the TTC chose another supplier, a prototype modified for Toronto's track characteristics would not be ready until 2023, with first delivery in 2024 or 2025.

By June 2020, the streetcar shortage had been alleviated by the reduction in ridership due to the COVID-19 pandemic in conjunction with temporary bus replacements on routes 511 Bathurst and 506 Carlton to accommodate construction projects. With more streetcars available, the TTC could ship up 19 extra streetcars to a Bombardier plant for warranty repairs, as well as introduce Flexity streetcars for the first time on route 503 Kingston Rd.

On October 22, 2020, the TTC board approved the immediate purchase of 13 additional streetcars from Bombardier for delivery in 2023, with an option for 47 more cars, if funding from senior levels of government became available. If the option were taken, the fleet size would increase to 264 streetcars by 2025. Since the existing carhouses can only hold 239 streetcars, the TTC recommended setting up a carhouse at the Hillcrest Complex to hold 25 streetcars.

Infrastructure

Track characteristics 
The track on the Toronto streetcar system has characteristics of non-standard gauge, tight curve radii and single-point switches that previous generations of high-floor streetcars were adept at handling. Some of these characteristics were problematic for Bombardier when it adapted its low-floor Flexity Outlook for Toronto's streetcar system.

Track gauge 

This broad gauge was adopted in 1861 for the city's horse-drawn streetcar lines to allow horse-drawn wagons and carriages to use the inside of the rail for a smoother ride through muddy, unpaved streets. The gauge also had the effect of precluding the movement of standard-gauge freight cars along streetcar lines. The unique gauge has remained to this day because it is easier to adapt new rail vehicles to this gauge than to convert the entire system to standard gauge. The three heavy-rail lines of the Toronto subway also use the unique gauge; however, the light-metro Line 3 Scarborough and two light rail lines under-construction (Line 5 Eglinton and Line 6 Finch West) use standard gauge.

Track curvature 

Track switches 

As with most legacy streetcar systems in North America, the TTC uses single-point switches in special work throughout the system. In contrast, most light-rail systems use double-point switches, with a movable blade on each track. With single-point switches, the blade is only on the inner rail of the curve, and streetcars must have a rigid, continuous axle to pull the wheel on the outer rail through the curve without the blade. Thus, low-floor streetcars with split axles cannot operate through single-point switches. In the early days of the CLRV, Bochum wheels with rubber rings holding the axle caused derailments due to a lack of rigidity, and had to be replaced with SAB wheels.

Streetcar switches are either manual or automatic. For automatic switches, there are loop antennae buried in the road and two transmitters onboard the vehicles. One transmitter is located at the front of the car to set and lock the switch; the second is at the rear to unlock the switch. Because of failing electronics, defective antennae, or the failure of the system to unlock after passage of a car, there is the risk of a streetcar taking the wrong path at a switch.

In 2002, the TTC instituted a "stop, check, go" rule for all facing point switches. Streetcar operators, when approaching such switches, must stop and check the switch-blade setting before proceeding. In 2008, an operator forgot to make this check, which resulted in two streetcars colliding. About 2015, the TTC modified the "stop, check, go" process to include pointing a finger. Each streetcar operator, upon arriving at a facing switch-point, is to stop short of the switch, point with their finger toward the switch's position to confirm that the switch is aligned properly for the streetcar's intended movement, and then proceed.

Loops 

Since all of Toronto's current streetcars are single-ended, turning loops are provided at the normal endpoints of each route and at likely intermediate turnback locations. A routing on-street around one or more city blocks may serve as a loop, but most loops on the system are wholly or partly off-street. Many of these are also interchange points with subway or bus services.

Grand unions 

The Toronto streetcar system has three grand unions where a streetcar approaching from any direction at a double-track streetcar junction can turn left or right or pass straight through. , Toronto was the only city in North America to still have full grand unions; other North American cities may have partial unions. The three full grand unions in Toronto are at:
 Spadina Avenue and Queen Street West
 Spadina Avenue and King Street West
 Bathurst Street and King Street West

There is also one  union at King Street West and Dufferin Street missing only the south-to-west curve. There are seven unions that are two curves short of a grand union. They are from east to west:
 Parliament Street and Dundas Street East
 Parliament Street and Queen Street East
 Church Street and Dundas Street East
 Queen Street West and Victoria Street
 Spadina Avenue and College Street 
 Bathurst Street and Dundas Street West
 King Street West, Queen Street West, The Queensway and Roncesvalles Avenue

Grand unions need to be replaced as their tracks wear out. The TTC requires two years of planning and preparation to replace a grand union. Once replaced, the tracks at the grand union are expected to last 20 to 25 years before needing replacement again.

Non-revenue streetcar lines
The streetcar system has non-revenue lines that inter-connect revenue routes and provide alternate routes for planned and emergency diversions. Some non-revenue lines are necessary for streetcars going in and out of service. Most non-revenue lines are located in downtown Toronto; they include, roughly from east to west:
 Leslie Street between Queen Street East and the Leslie Barns: This connects a carhouse to the rest of the streetcar system.
 Coxwell Avenue between lower Gerrard Street East and Queen Street East
 Parliament Street between Gerrard Street East and King Street East
 Church Street between Carlton Street and King Street East
 Church Street southbound to Wellington Street westbound to York Street northbound: The 503 Kingston Rd streetcar used this single-track line as a turning loop until 2017.
 Victoria Street between Dundas Street East and Adelaide Street East
 Richmond Street East from Church Street to York Street (westbound only)
 Adelaide Street East from Victoria Street to Church Street (eastbound only)
 York Street from King Street West to Queen Street West (northbound only)
 Bay Street between College Street and Dundas Street West
 McCaul Street between Queen Street East and College Street
 Bathurst Street between Bathurst station and St. Clair Avenue West (segment between Vaughan Road and St. Clair Avenue West is northbound only): This connects the otherwise isolated 512 St. Clair streetcar line and the Hillcrest Complex to the rest of the streetcar system.
 Vaughan Road south of St. Clair Avenue West (southbound only) is part of the above non-revenue streetcar line
 Shaw Street between King Street West and Queen Street West
 Ossington Avenue between Dundas Street West and College Street
 Dufferin Street between King Street West and Queen Street West

Richmond, Adelaide, Wellington and York Streets used to be two-way streets with double streetcar tracks. After these streets were converted to one-way streets, the TTC had to abandon the use of the wrong-way track.

To accommodate construction of the Ontario Line near Queen station, Metrolinx, the line's sponsor, requires the suspension of streetcar traffic between Church and York Streets for 4.5 years. Metrolinx agreed to construct a new southbound streetcar track on York Street at least to Adelaide Street West, and a new eastbound streetcar track on Adelaide Street between York and Victoria Streets. During the diversion, westbound 501 Queen streetcars would divert via Church, Richmond and York Streets while eastbound streetcars would divert via York, Adelaide and Church Streets. After Queen Street reopens to through traffic, the new streetcar tracks would be retained as non-revenue tracks to provide the TTC with flexibility for future diversions. The City of Toronto also intends to restore non-revenue streetcar tracks on Adelaide Street between Charlotte and York Streets in addition to the restoration of tracks between York and Victoria Streets to provide further flexibility for diversions.

Electrical pickup 

The older CLRV and ALRV streetcars had only a trolley pole. Flexity Outlook streetcars have both a pantograph and a trolley pole. All streetcars in service had been using the trolley pole until September 12, 2017, when 509 Harbourfront became the first route to use the pantograph.

With the introduction of the Flexity streetcars, the TTC plans to convert the entire system to be pantograph-compatible. The new streetcars need 50 percent more electrical current than the older streetcars, and use of the trolley pole limits the amount of electricity the new cars can draw from the overhead wire, resulting in reduced performance. One consequence of trolley pole use on the Flexity streetcars is that air conditioning does not function in summer. With pantograph operation, the TTC expects Flexity streetcars to have more efficient heating and air conditioning systems, better vehicle performance and fewer delays caused by disconnections from overhead wires.

Since 2008, the TTC has been converting the streetcar overhead wire to be compatible for pantograph electrical pickup as well as for trolley poles. The overhead over the Fleet Street tracks was the first to be converted. The new overhead uses different hangers so that pantographs do not strike supporting crosswires. It also uses a different gauge of wire to handle the higher electrical demands of Flexity Outlook streetcars.

During a rainy period in February 2018, the TTC received an incentive to expedite the conversion of the electrical overhead for pantograph use by the Flexity streetcars. On February 20, 2018, Flexity streetcars using trolley poles were pulling down some of the overhead. In Toronto, the tip of the trolley pole has a shoe with a carbon insert to collect current. The carbon insert also lowers the trolley shoe so that it does not strike hangers that are not yet pantograph-compatible. During wet weather, these carbon inserts wear out faster, needing replacement after a day or two for older streetcars. However, because the Flexity streetcars draw more current than older streetcars, their carbon inserts wore out faster in less than eight hours in the wet weather. (There was also an issue with the quality of carbon the TTC purchased.) With pantographs, this would be less of a problem as the pantograph blades have a larger contact area than a trolley shoe to absorb wear. Because of this incident, the TTC decided it should accelerate the conversion of overhead for pantograph use.

The first three routes to operate with pantographs were 509 Harbourfront on September 12, 2017, 510 Spadina on May 14, 2018, and 512 St. Clair on October 1, 2018. The streetcar system has almost  of streetcar overhead along streets and in yards. , 80 percent of the overhead has been converted for pantograph use and half of all streetcar routes use pantographs. The TTC expects full conversion by the first quarter of 2025, when trolley poles will no longer be supported.

Dedicated station 
 is the one standalone underground station that does not connect to the subway. It is located in the tunnel, shared by the 509 Harbourfront and 510 Spadina routes, between Queens Quay West and Union subway station.

Carhouses 

Toronto's streetcars are housed and maintained at various carhouses or "streetcar barns":

Several carhouses were once part of the TTC's streetcar operations, many inherited from the TTC's predecessors Toronto Railway Company and Toronto Civic Railways:

Source: The TTC's Active Carhouses

Winter operational issues

Extreme cold weather 
The fleet of CLRV and ALRV streetcars experienced several operational issues during extreme cold temperatures during late 2013 and early 2014, late 2014 and early 2015, late 2017 and early 2018, and late 2018 and early 2019, as doors and brakes failed as moisture in the pneumatic lines froze. Moisture also caused track sanders to fail. Buses were used to replace streetcars unfit for service, some of which had failed while in service. The new Flexity Outlook streetcars were unaffected by the weather, as they use electronic braking and door operations. During an extreme cold snap between January 20 and 22, 2019, none of the CLRV/ALRV streetcars were in service due to the high risk of breakdowns in the cold weather. Instead, Flexity streetcars, along with buses, were used to provide service. The remaining ALRVs stayed out of service for the rest of that winter season.

By 2020, the CLRV/ALRV vehicles had been entirely replaced by new Flexity Outlook streetcars, mitigating these operational issues from occurring in the foreseeable future.

Snow and freezing rain 
The streetcar overhead is vulnerable during freezing rain storms. During such storms, the TTC applies anti-freeze to the overhead wire to prevent ice from interrupting electrical contact. In addition, the TTC attaches "sliders" to trolley poles on every fifth streetcar to knock ice off the overhead wire. The TTC places overhead crews on standby at various locations around the streetcar network to address problems of power loss or overhead wires coming down.

The anti-freeze used on the overheard wire is also applied to streetcar switches on the network. In addition, the TTC runs "storm cars" overnight on all routes to prevent any ice build-up on switches that the anti-freeze could not prevent.

In severe storms, the TTC replaces streetcars with buses on some routes, or portions of routes, in order to concentrate streetcars downtown. By creating a smaller service area, it is easier for TTC crews to keep track and overhead wires free of snow and ice. In the event of a severe storm, the TTC replaces streetcars with buses on routes 506 Carlton, 511 Bathurst, and 512 St. Clair, plus the outer portions of 501 Queen and 504 King.

Another problem that the TTC must cope with following a heavy snowfall is that motorists park cars too close to streetcar tracks because snow banks narrow streets. Motorists are warned that such vehicles will be towed to prevent streetcar service delays and diversions.

Advertising 
Pattison Outdoor Advertising is responsible for posters outside and inside the streetcars, as well as outside and inside the buses and the subway system.

See also 

Toronto Transit Commission bus system
Urban rail transit in Canada
Metrolinx light rail projects under construction in Toronto:
Line 5 Eglinton
Line 6 Finch West
Queen subway line (a streetcar tunnel)
 used by 501 Queen and 508 Lake Shore
 along 504 King route
Birney (Toronto streetcar) (a model of streetcar operated by the TTC)
Streetcars in North America (for other streetcar lines in North America)
List of street railways in Canada – a full list of operating and defunct street railways in the country

Notes

References

Inline citations

Other references 

 – includes a timeline of the history of the Toronto streetcar system

External links 

Toronto Transit Commission
Subway and streetcar map
Transit Toronto Streetcar Pages
The Toronto LRT Information Page
Geographically accurate map on Google Maps
 gallery of Toronto's streetcars on public-transport.net

 
Streetcars in Canada
1861 introductions
1861 in rail transport
4 ft 10⅞ in gauge railways
600 V DC railway electrification
Town tramway systems by city
Light rail in Canada
Electric railways in Canada
Street railways in Ontario